The Hyundai S engine is Hyundai's first V6 diesel engine. This engine has a displacement of 3.0l.

S

3.0L (D6EA)
This engine is rated at 20 mpg city, 30 mpg highway and passes the US Emissions Standards.

Applications

 Hyundai Veracruz (2006–2011)
 Kia Mohave (2008–2011)

S II

3.0L (D6EB)
This engine is Euro6 compliant.

Applications

 Hyundai Veracruz (2012–2015)
 Kia Mohave (2011–present)

See also

 List of Hyundai engines

References

S
Diesel engines by model
V6 engines